"Einmal um die Welt" ("One time around the world") is the fifth single by German rapper Cro. A pop and rap song, it was produced by Cro and Kilians. The lyrics and musical composition are attributed to Cro. On 27 October, the music video was released. The single was released on 2 November 2012 as the fifth single from Cro's debut album Raop on 23 March 2012 through Chimperator Productions. 

The song samples "Fight the Start" by German indie rock band The Kilians. The official video clip was filmed entirely in Portugal (Lisbon and Cascais).

Track listing

Charts

Year-end charts

Certifications

References

External links 

2012 songs
2012 singles
Cro (rapper) songs
German-language songs